This is a comprehensive list of awards and nominations won by Doda, a Polish singer-songwriter.

MTV Awards 

|-
| style="text-align:center;"| 2007 ||rowspan=4| Doda || Best Polish Act|| 
|-
| style="text-align:center;" rowspan=2| 2009 || Best Polish Act|| 
|-
| Best European Act|| 
|-
| style="text-align:center;"| 2011 || Best Polish Act||

Viva Comet Awards 

|-
| style="text-align:center;" rowspan=4| 2007 ||rowspan=3| Doda || Artist of the Year|| 
|-
| Chart Awards||  
|-
| Image of the Year||  
|-
| style="text-align:left;"| "Katharsis"|| Music Video of the Year|| 
|-
| style="text-align:center;" rowspan=4| 2008 ||rowspan=3| Doda || Artist of the Year|| 
|-
| Chart Awards||  
|-
| Image of the Year||  
|-
| style="text-align:left;"| "Nie Daj Się"|| Music Video of the Year|| 
|-
| style="text-align:center;" rowspan=3| 2010 ||rowspan=1| "Rany" || Music Video of the Year|| 
|-
| style="text-align:left;"|Doda|| Artist of the Decade|| 
|-
| style="text-align:left;"|"Szansa"|| Song of the Decade|| 
|-
| style="text-align:center;"| 2011 ||rowspan=1| Doda || Artist of the Year|| 
|-
| style="text-align:left;"| 2012 ||rowspan=1| "XXX"|| Music Video of the Year|| 

Doda